GP-1 is a motorcycle racing game developed by Genki and published by Atlus for the SNES, which was released in 1993. It was followed by sequel, GP-1: Part II.

Gameplay

There is an Exhibition mode that can support two players and the Season mode. It is possible to choose between six bikes, and six different engineers whose skills match the player's racing style. While the bikes are slightly different from each other having different suspensions, engines and frames, there is no real difference between the engineers but still they will influence the improvement or worsening of the bike performance.

To be a successful racer, the player must invest in the best equipment and fine-tune his bike so that it runs at an optimal level. To do this, the player will have to race against 15 opponents on 13 tracks located in 12 countries in order to win some pocket money. The game features real tracks all over the world but, even though the display on the menu is correct for the tracks, while playing some turns are wrong or non-existent. During the championship, the player will receive money for getting the first positions on each race, which enable him to upgrade parts of his bike fine-tuning it for better performance. While learning each course, the player will have to find the perfect racing line if he wants to have a chance at winning. In Grand Prix racing there's a fine line between executing the ideal turn and making a mistake that will send the player flying off his bike and tumbling down the track.

The soundtrack of GP-1 was composed by Masanao Akahori.

Racetracks
  Japan
  Australia
  Malaysia
  Spain
  Italy
   Europe (Spain,in Barcelona)
  Germany
  Netherlands
  Hungary
  France
  Great Britain
  Brazil
  South Africa

Reception
Allgame gave the game a rating of 2.5 stars out of a possible 5. GamePro gave the game a rating of 4 out of 5 while German video gaming magazine Total! gave the game a rating of 3.25 out of 6.

See also
 GP-1: Part II - video game sequel
 Racing Damashii
 Bike Daisuki! Hashiriya Kon – Rider's Spirits
 Bari Bari Densetsu

References

External links
 GP-1 at MobyGames
 GP-1 at superfamicom.org
 GP-1 at super-famicom.jp 

1993 video games
Atlus games
Genki (company) games
Motorcycle video games
Racing video games
Super Nintendo Entertainment System games
Super Nintendo Entertainment System-only games
Video games developed in Japan
Grand Prix motorcycle racing
Multiplayer and single-player video games